Louis Botha (born 2 February 1957) is a South African table tennis player. He competed in the men's singles event at the 1992 Summer Olympics.

References

External links
 

1957 births
Living people
South African male table tennis players
Olympic table tennis players of South Africa
Table tennis players at the 1992 Summer Olympics
Place of birth missing (living people)
20th-century South African people